MTS Systems Corporation (MTS) is a global supplier of test systems and industrial position sensors. The company provides test and measurement products to determine the performance and reliability of vehicles, aircraft, civil structures, biomedical materials and devices and raw materials. Examples of MTS products include: aerodynamics simulators, seismic simulators, load frames, hydraulic actuators and sensors. The company operates in two divisions: Test and Sensors.

In December 2020, Amphenol Corporation announced it had reached an agreement to acquire MTS in an acquisition completed on April 7, 2021. In January 2021, ITW announced it had in turn reached an agreement to acquire the test and simulation business of MTS from Amphenol in the future.

Test Division

MTS designs and produces test systems to simulate the forces and motions that materials, products and structures are expected to encounter. The Test division has customers in the Americas, Europe and Asia, which respectively represent approximately 30%, 30% and 40% of total orders. Products and customers are grouped into three global segments: Ground Vehicles, Materials and Structures.

The Ground Vehicles segment consists of automobile, truck, motorcycle, motorsports vehicle, construction equipment, agricultural equipment, rail, and off-road vehicle manufacturers and their suppliers. MTS test system and service products are used for the testing of vehicles, subsystems and components.

The Materials segment covers diverse industries, including raw material manufacturing, power generation, aerospace, vehicles, geomaterials, biomaterials and biomedical devices, consumer products and construction materials. The company's products and services support customers in research and development and QA/QC testing of products through the physical characterization of materials, such as ceramics, composites and steel. Biomedical applications include systems to test durability and performance of implants, prostheses, and other medical materials and devices.

The Structures segment serves the structural testing needs in the fields of aerospace, wind energy, structural engineering, and petroleum, among others. The aerospace structural testing market consists of manufacturers of commercial, military, and private aircraft and their suppliers. The energy market consists of wind turbine manufacturers and their component suppliers and the oil and gas industry. Structural engineering customers include government agencies, universities and the manufacturers of building materials.

Sensors Division

The industries that use MTS Sensors include manufacturers of plastic injection molding machines, steel mills, fluid power, oil and gas, medical, wood product processing equipment, mobile equipment and alternative energy. Sensors division products are also used to measure fluid displacement, such as liquid levels for customers in the process industries. The Sensors division manufactures products utilizing magnetostriction technology. MTS has developed an implementation of the technology, known as Temposonics. The Sensors division has a range of customers in the Americas, Europe and Asia that represent approximately 25%, 50% and 25% of orders, respectively. With the acquisition of PCB Group Inc. in 2016, MTS has increased Sensor products and presence.

PCB Piezotronics, Inc. is a designer and manufacturer of microphones, vibration, pressure, force, torque, load, and strain sensors, as well as the pioneer of ICP technology used by design engineers and predictive maintenance professionals worldwide for test, measurement, monitoring, and control requirements in automotive, aerospace, industrial, R&D, military, educational, commercial, OEM applications, and more.

In June 2021 MTS Sensors began operating under the name Temposonics following Amphenol's acquisition of MTS Systems earlier that year.  https://www.temposonics.com/NewsEvents/PressReleases/04-06-21---temposonics-rebranding

Notable Projects
MTS Installs Latest Seismic Simulation System at Earthquake Engineering Facility in Taiwan to Help Save Lives 
Vehicle Dynamics Simulation 
High-temperature materials testing for aerospace 
MTS and University of Minnesota Deliver Driver Assistance Technology for "Bus on Shoulder" Transportation 
Custom built Flat Trac LTRe for the National Tire Research Center in Alton, VA, which displays "...some of the most advanced technology in tire testing and research."
State-of-the-art 360-degree driving simulator. Commonly referred to as "The World's Most Advanced Driving Simulator"
First of its kind tuned mass damper for Citigroup Center in New York City and John Hancock Tower in Boston.
Designed the AWD Slot-Car ride system for Walt Disney Imagineering’s Enhanced motion vehicle ride system.
Manufacturing and design for Universal Parks & Resorts, including the launch system for the Incredible Hulk Coaster; the ride systems for The Cat in the Hat and Men in Black: Alien Attack at Universal Orlando, Jaws at Universal Studios Japan, and Mario Kart: Koopa's Challenge at Universal Studios Japan; as well as the dinosaurs at Islands of Adventure's Jurassic Park River Adventure.

References

External links

 

American companies established in 1967
Electronics companies of the United States
Manufacturing companies based in Minnesota
Companies based in Eden Prairie, Minnesota
Companies formerly listed on the Nasdaq
Electronics companies established in 1967
1967 establishments in Minnesota
Sensor manufacturers
2021 mergers and acquisitions
American corporate subsidiaries